Zolotaryov or Zolotarev; feminine: Zolotaryova or Zolotareva is a Russian-language occupational surname derived from the occupation of золотарь, or goldsmith. It may be transliterate in German as Solotaroff.

Notable people with this surname include:

Akim Zolotaryov (1853–?), Russian writer and general;
Boris Zolotaryov (b. 1953), Russian politician;
Karp Zolotaryov (fl. last quarter of the 17th century), Russian icon painter
Vasily Zolotarev (1872–1964), Russian composer
Vladislav Zolotaryov (1942–1975), Russian composer
Vladislav Valerevich Zolotaryov (1991), Director of Uchasia
Yegor Zolotarev (1847–1878), Russian mathematician

Olga Zolotaryova, Soviet female athlete
Tatyana Zolotareva, Russian marathon runner

See also
Solotaroff

Russian-language surnames
Occupational surnames